The Saurer 6DM is a heavy truck manufactured by Adolph Saurer AG.

The name 6DM reflects its 6 tonne payload. The two-axle vehicle has a power output of 250 hp. The driving Formula 4x4 is driven 4 of 4 existing wheels. Its bigger "brother", the Saurer 10DM, has 3 axes (6-Wheel), a 10 tonne payload and 320 hp.

The vehicles are equipped with Saurer six-cylinder engines and turbochargers are connected via a semi-automatic transmission. Some units are equipped with a winch,  which costs 60 liters of fuel capacity.

The 6DM and 10DM were the first military vehicles of the Swiss Army, which went into operation with NATO structure. The most widespread are flatbeds with tarp for troops and supplies, but they also serve as fire engines for military airfields. The firefighting version includes the special F/A-18C Maquette device. It also serves as a crane truck and as container transporter for the operating components for TAFLIR (tactical aircraft radar). As these trucks reach the end of their useful life they are replaced by trucks from Iveco.

References

External links 

Swissmotor German only
Fahrzeuge der Schweizer Armee by Markus Hofmann (2000)
Saurer 6DM Lastw 6t gl 4x4 Militärfahrzeuge.ch

Military trucks of Switzerland
Off-road vehicles
Fire service vehicles